The men's heptathlon event at the 2021 European Athletics Indoor Championships was held on 6 and 7 March 2021.

Medalists

Records

Results

60 metres

Long jump

Shot put

High jump

60 metres hurdles

Pole vault

1000 metres

Final results

References

2021 European Athletics Indoor Championships
Combined events at the European Athletics Indoor Championships